Ein Ganim was the first moshav po'alim ("workers' moshav") in Ottoman Palestine. 

The moshav was established in 1908 near Petah Tikva by members of the Second Aliyah and was named after the Levitical city of Ein Ganim, mentioned in the book of Joshua 21:29. The moshav poalim was an attempt to combine farming and urban labor (garden city movement). In addition to working in the city, families received land for tending small kitchen gardens. The moshav poalim differed in approach from the moshav ovdim ("laborers' moshav"): It was not based on collective ideology or settling national land. The experiment failed because the kitchen gardens did not generate sufficient income. 
 
According to the 1931 census  Ein Ganim had a population of 335 Jews, in 77 houses. 

In 1937, Ein Ganim became a neighborhood of Petah Tikva.

Notable residents
General Moshe Peled  was born here

References

Agriculture in Israel
Moshavim
Populated places established in 1908
1908 establishments in the Ottoman Empire
Petah Tikva